McKeague is a surname. Notable people with the surname include:

David McKeague (born 1946), American judge
John McKeague (died 1982), Northern Irish politician
Kelly K. McKeague, Director, Defense POW/MIA Accounting Agency
Kevin McKeague, Irish hurler
Corrie McKeague, missing RAF pilot